Gregory Zilboorg (Russian: Григорий Зильбург) (December 25, 1890 – September 17, 1959) was a psychoanalyst and historian of psychiatry who is remembered for situating psychiatry within a broad sociological and humanistic context in his many writings and lectures.

Life and career

Zilboorg was born into a Jewish family in Kiev, Ukraine on December 25, 1890 and studied medicine in St. Petersburg, where he worked under Vladimir Bekhterev. In 1917, after the February Revolution, he served as secretary to the Ministry of Labor under two prime ministers (Aleksandr Kerenskii and Georgii L'vov). When the Bolsheviks came to power, he fled to Kiev and established a reputation as a political journalist and drama critic.

Zilboorg emigrated to the United States in 1919 and supported himself by lecturing on the Chautauqua circuit and translating literature from Russian to English.  Among the works he translated is Evgenii Zamiatin's novel We, and Leonid Andreyev's 1915 play He Who Gets Slapped Well received, that translation has been republished 17 times since that initial publication. In 1922 he began studying for his second medical degree, at Columbia University.

After graduating in 1926, he worked at the Bloomingdale Hospital and in 1931 began his psychoanalytic practice in New York City, having first been analysed in Berlin by Franz Alexander. From the 1930s onward, Zilboorg produced several volumes of lasting importance on the history of psychiatry. The Medical Man and the Witch During the Renaissance began as the Noguchi lectures at Johns Hopkins University in 1935. This volume was followed by A History of Medical Psychology in 1941 and Sigmund Freud in 1951. He also produced a series of clinical articles on subjects from the schizoid personality to postpartum depression - he considered the latter as rooted in ambivalence over motherhood and latent sadism - and explored the effects of unresolved conflicts and countertransference affects of the analyst in the analytic situation.

Zilboorg's patients included George Gershwin, Lillian Hellman, Ralph Ingersoll, Edward M.M. Warburg, Marshall Field, Kay Swift and James Warburg. The musical Lady in the Dark is reportedly based on Moss Hart's experience of analysis with Zilboorg, who also examined other noted writers including Thomas Merton.
Zilboorg married Ray Liebow in 1919 and they had two children (Nancy and Gregory, Jr.). He married Margaret Stone in 1946 and they had three children (Caroline, John and Matthew). His niece was cellist Olga Zilboorg.

Even half a century after his death, Zilboorg's reputation is riddled with salacious rumours, unsupported accusations, and information taken out of context. Citing Susan Quinn,
author  Ron Chernow
reports that Zilboorg engaged in unethical behavior including financial exploitation of patients. In an interview with Chernow, Edward M. M. Warburg reported that Zilboorg asked him for cash gifts and, in one instance, a mink coat for his wife. The extensively researched and meticulously documented biography The Life of Gregory Zilboorg (see further reading below) goes some distance to give a rounded picture of a brilliant, complicated and charismatic man. It also recounts in detail Zilboorg's spiritual journey, his friendship with the Dominican Noël Mailloux, and his eventual conversion to Roman Catholicism.

Literary archives
Zilboorg's papers at the Beinecke Rare Book and Manuscript Library, Yale University, contain manuscripts of several of his publications as well as his personal correspondence with Margaret Stone Zilboorg.

Bibliography

Writings
The passing of the old order in Europe (1920)
The medical man and the witch during the renaissance (1935)
A history of medical psychology (1941)
Mind,  Medicine, & Man (1943)
Sigmund Freud (1951)
Psychology of the criminal act and punishment (1954)
Psychoanalysis and Religion (1962)

Translations
He Who Gets Slapped by Leonid Andreyev, translated from the Russian with an introduction (1921)
We by Yevgeny Zamyatin, translated from the Russian (1924)
The criminal, the judge and the public; a psychological analysis by Franz Alexander and Hugo Staub, translated from the German (1931)
Outline of clinical psychoanalysis by Otto Fenichel, translated by Bertram D. Lewin and Gregory Zilboorg (1934)

See also
Bertram D. Lewin
Grandiosity
Karl Stern
Psychoanalytic Quarterly
Thomas Merton

References

Further reading
 Gregory Zilboorg Papers. Yale Collection of American Literature, Beinecke Rare Book and Manuscript Library. (Finding aid).
 Caroline Zilboorg, The Life of Gregory Zilboorg, 1890–1940: Psyche, Psychiatry, and Psychoanalysis (The History of Psychoanalysis Series), London: Routledge, 2021.
 Caroline Zilboorg, The Life of Gregory Zilboorg, 1940–1959: Mind, Medicine, and Man (The History of Psychoanalysis Series), London: Routledge, 2021.

External links

 
 
 
 Gregory Zilboorg Papers. Yale Collection of American Literature, Beinecke Rare Book and Manuscript Library.
 https://sites.google.com/view/gregory-zilboorg/home

1890 births
1959 deaths
Physicians from Kyiv
People from Kiev Governorate
Ukrainian Jews
White Russian emigrants to the United States
Jewish American writers
Russian writers
Psychology writers
Russian translators
Ukrainian translators
20th-century American psychologists
Ukrainian psychologists
Jewish Ukrainian writers
20th-century Ukrainian people
20th-century American male writers
20th-century American translators
Converts to Roman Catholicism from Judaism
20th-century American Jews